Phelsuma sundbergi, commonly called the La Digue day gecko, Mahé day gecko, or Seychelles giant day gecko, is a species of lizard in the family Gekkonidae. The species is endemic to Seychelles and has three subspecies.

Etymology
The specific name, sundbergi, is in honor of Swedish amateur ichthyologist Henrik Sundberg.

Habitat
The natural habitats of P. sundbergi are subtropical or tropical dry forests, subtropical or tropical moist lowland forests, subtropical or tropical moist montane forests, plantations, rural gardens, urban areas, and introduced vegetation.

Conservation status
P. sundbergi is threatened by habitat loss.

Reproduction
P. sundbergi is oviparous.

Subspecies
Three subspecies are recognized as being valid, including the nominotypical subspecies.
Phelsuma sundbergi sundbergi  – Seychelles giant day gecko 
Phelsuma sundbergi ladiguensis  – La Digue day gecko 
Phelsuma sundbergi longinsulae  – Mahé day gecko

References

Further reading
Glaw, Frank; Rösler, Herbert (2015). "Taxonomic checklist of the day geckos of the genera Phelsuma Gray, 1825 and Rhotropella Hewitt, 1937 (Squamata: Gekkonidae)". Vertebrate Zoology 65 (2): 247–283. (Phelsuma sundbergi, pp. 270–271).
Rendahl H (1939). "Zur Herpetologie der Seychellen. I. Reptilien ". Zoologische Jahrbücher, Abteilung für Systematik, Geographie und Biologie der Tiere 72: 255–328. (Phelsuma sundbergi, new species, p. 274, Figures 3–5). (in German).

External links

sundbergi
Reptiles described in 1939
Endemic fauna of Seychelles
Taxonomy articles created by Polbot